Optimal sorting may refer to:

 in a sequential context, an optimal comparison sort
 in a parallel context, an optimal sorting network